Andrew Hurd (born August 12, 1982) is a Canadian former freestyle swimmer.  He began swimming at age 8 and was a student at the University of Michigan.  He won a gold medal on the world cup circuit in 2000 in Edmonton, Alberta in the 1500-metre freestyle event.  He was born in Cambridge, Ontario.

He was a member of the Canadian team that finished in fifth place in the 4 × 200 m freestyle at the 2008 Summer Olympics in Beijing.

See also
 List of Commonwealth Games medallists in swimming (men)
 List of University of Michigan alumni

References

1982 births
Living people
Canadian male freestyle swimmers
Commonwealth Games silver medallists for Canada
Michigan Wolverines men's swimmers
Olympic swimmers of Canada
Sportspeople from Ontario
Swimmers at the 2000 Summer Olympics
Swimmers at the 2004 Summer Olympics
Swimmers at the 2008 Summer Olympics
World Aquatics Championships medalists in swimming
Commonwealth Games medallists in swimming
Swimmers at the 2006 Commonwealth Games
Medallists at the 2006 Commonwealth Games